Ashley Probets (born 13 December 1984) is an English footballer who plays for Punjab United.

He started his career with Arsenal, followed by a six-month spell in The Football League with Rochdale. Since then he has plied his trade in the English non-League football, at Welling United, Barnet, Chatham Town, Thamesmead Town and VCD Athletic among others.

In July 2016 he joined Phoenix Sports from VCD Athletic and remained for 3 years until returning to VCD Athletic. Probets joined Punjab United in May 2022.

References

1984 births
Living people
English footballers
Association football defenders
Arsenal F.C. players
Rochdale A.F.C. players
Welling United F.C. players
Barnet F.C. players
Chatham Town F.C. players
Thamesmead Town F.C. players
Phoenix Sports F.C. players
VCD Athletic F.C. players
Punjab United F.C. players
English Football League players
Isthmian League players